Brixton Hill is the name given to a  section of road between Brixton and Streatham Hill in south London, England.

Brixton Hill and Streatham Hill form part of the traditional main London to Brighton road (A23). The road follows the line of a Roman Road, the London to Brighton Way, which diverges from Stane Street near Kennington, and led south from the capital, Londinium, to a port on the south coast.

History
Prior to the late 19th century, the road was known as Brixton (or Bristow) Causeway. On the eastern side of the road, a series of tree-lined open spaces and front gardens make up Rush Common — an area of former common land that, although it is subject to a prohibition on 'erections above the surface of the earth' under an Act of Parliament of 1806, has seen some incursions for building.

The name Brixton Hill has subsequently been given to the residential areas on both sides of the road, and since 2002, it has also been the name of an electoral ward of the London Borough of Lambeth.

From 1891 until the 1950s Brixton Hill was served by a regular London tram service; it was cable-drawn until 1904 when it was replaced by a conventional electric tram. The tram depot at Streatham Hill, opposite Telford Avenue, housed the tram cars, horses and the steam-powered winding gear for the cable. It is now a bus depot.
Another surviving tram shed, which can still be seen near the junction of Brixton Hill with Christchurch Road, was designed by London County Council Tramways' architect G. Topham Forest, and had a capacity of 30 trams.

Notable residents
Edward Petherick, Australian bookseller and bibliophile lived at Yarra Yarra 30 Brixton Hill. He maintained a library, which was particularly extensive as regards Australia. George William Rusden was a frequent visitor when writing his books History of Australia and History of New Zealand.
67 (rap group)
Sarah Everard, a marketing executive was living here. She was murdered in 2021.

Lambeth Council elections

References 

 

Streets in the London Borough of Lambeth
Brixton